Bosnia and Herzegovina participated in the 2010 Summer Youth Olympics in Singapore.

Medalists

Athletics

Girls
Track and Road Events

Judo

Individual

Team

Swimming

Tennis

Singles

Doubles

References

External links
Competitors List: Bosnia and Herzegovina

2010 in Bosnia and Herzegovina sport
Nations at the 2010 Summer Youth Olympics
Bosnia and Herzegovina at the Youth Olympics